Sarmi may refer to:

Places
 Sarmi, Nepal, a village in Nepal
 Sarmi, Indonesia, a town in Papua, Indonesia
 Sarmi Regency, an administrative unit in Papua, Indonesia

People
Massimo Sarmi (born 1948), Italian businessman
Count Ferdinando Sarmi (born 1912), Italian-born American fashion designer and businessman
Hilal Al Sarmi (born 1978), Omani politician